Ronald Patrick "Ron" Clark (born 15 August 1966) a United States Army lieutenant general who serves as the senior military assistant to the United States Secretary of Defense. He previously commanded the United States Army Central from 2021 to 2022. He also served as the Chief of Staff, United States Indo-Pacific Command. He previously served as the commander of the 25th Infantry Division, and, before that, as the Chief of Staff, United States Army Pacific.

Military career
Ron Clark was commissioned as a second lieutenant of Infantry upon graduation from the United States Military Academy at West Point in 1988. He began his career as a Rifle Platoon Leader and Scout Platoon Leader in 5th Battalion, 5th Cavalry Regiment, 3rd Armored Division, both in Germany and in Southwest Asia during Operation Desert Shield and Operation Desert Storm. He was assigned to the 25th Infantry Division, at Schofield Barracks, Hawaii, where he commanded B Company, 1st Battalion, 27th Infantry Regiment, and later served as aide-de-camp to the Commanding General, 25th Infantry Division (Light) and US Army Hawaii.

Clark served as Operations Officer and Executive Officer in 1st Battalion (Airborne), 509th Infantry Regiment at Fort Polk, Louisiana. He later served as aide-de-camp to the Commanding General, United States Army Forces Command at Fort McPherson, Georgia. Clark was Commander of the 1st Battalion, 506th Infantry Regiment, 101st Airborne Division (Air Assault) both at Fort Campbell, Kentucky and in Iraq in support of Operation Iraqi Freedom.

Clark was the 41st Chief of Infantry Branch at United States Army Human Resources Command. He also served as Director of the Center for the Army Profession and Ethic at West Point. He was Commander of the 192d Infantry Brigade at Fort Benning, Georgia. Next, Clark was the Army's Deputy Director of Strategy, Plans and Policy in the Pentagon. He followed that by serving as Deputy Commanding General – Support, 82nd Airborne Division at Fort Bragg, North Carolina and in Iraq during Operation Inherent Resolve. Clark also served as the Deputy Chief of Staff-Operations for the NATO Allied Rapid Reaction Corps.

Clark replaced Major General Christopher G. Cavoli as commander of the 25th Infantry Division on 4 January 2018.

In May 2022, Clark was nominated for reappointment as lieutenant general as assignment as the senior military assistant to the secretary of defense.

Education
Clark earned a Bachelor of Science degree from the United States Military Academy in 1988. He followed this with a Master of Military Art and Science degree at the United States Army Command and General Staff College.

Clark completed a United States Army College Fellowship at Duke University. He also graduated from the MIT Seminar XXI National Security Studies Program.

Media
In 2006, then Battalion Commander Lieutenant Colonel Clark appeared in a video about the usage of tanks during the deployment of the 1st Battalion, 506th Infantry Regiment, 101st Airborne Division (Air Assault) in Ramadi, Iraq.

Also in 2006, Clark was featured in a video titled "Band of Brothers" about the deployment of the 1st Battalion, 506th Infantry Regiment, 101st Airborne Division (Air Assault) in Ramadi, Iraq.

Clark was interviewed on 17 September 2018 by The West Point Center for Oral History and reflected on his career and leadership principles as well as the role that West Point has played in his life.

Clark appeared in a video invitation to the 25th Infantry Division Association to Tropic Lightning Week on 5 October 2018.

On 31 July 2020, Duke University Professor David Schanzer joined Major General Clark in a conversation about race, diversity, and inclusion in the U.S. Army.

Awards and decorations

Personal life
Clark is married and has two adult children.

References

Living people
1966 births
Military personnel from Montana
Recipients of the Distinguished Service Medal (US Army)
Recipients of the Defense Superior Service Medal
Recipients of the Legion of Merit
United States Army generals
United States Army Rangers
United States Military Academy alumni
United States Army personnel of the Gulf War
United States Army personnel of the Iraq War